St. Sebastian's Church, Chittattukara is a Syro-Malabar Catholic Church situated 22 kilometres to the north-west of Thrissur City,  Kerala, India, and 5 kilometres south eas of Guruvayur Town. It is 6 kilometres away from the historically important Palayur Church.

History 
Chittattukara's Christian community is believed to have been formed in the 12th century.. The mother parish of Chittattukara is Palayur Church. In the 12th century, a new chapel was established in Chittattukara called Muthyema Chapel.

In 1770 the present parish was established and initially the Muthyema Chapel was used as the parish church. It soon became too small for the congregation, and a new church was built in 1792. The present church (in Portuguese style), the third parish church, was built shortly after 1800.

Chittattukara parish church is dedicated to St. Sebastian.

The parish is one of 11 parishes in the Mattom Forane.

Chapels 
There are seven chapels under the parish:

 Muthyema Chapel
 Velankanni Matha Chapel
 St Antony's Chapel (Kakkassery East)
 Calvary Chapel
 The Western Chapel 
 Chakkanthara Chapel (Kakkassery North)
 Kadavalloor Chapel

Major celebrations 
The major festival celebrated here is the feast of St. Sebastian known as "Kambidi Thirunnal" on 6 and 7 January. The celebration begins on 4 January. The 2 km Angadi road is decorated with pindis and lights. The main attraction of the feast is the fireworks. The main firework is on 6 and 7 January. Small fireworks are conducted on 4 and 5.

References

External links 
 http://www.smcim.org/church/chittattukara/article/146

Eastern Catholic churches in Kerala
Churches in Thrissur district
1770 establishments in India
Syro-Malabar Catholic church buildings
Roman Catholic churches completed in the 1800s
Saint Sebastian